

Offseason

Recruiting

Exhibition

Regular season

News and notes
September 30: Heather Kashman scored her first career goal in her NCAA debut as New Hampshire bested the Niagara Purple Eagles. The six goals scored by New Hampshire marked the highest goal scoring output since Oct. 18, 2009 (also against Niagara in a 6-1 victory). It was also the highest number of goals scored by the squad in a road game since Feb. 8, 2009 at Vermont (6-2 win).
November 18: Minnesota skater Amanda Kessel registered 5 points as the Golden Gophers defeated the Wildcats by an 11-0 tally. New Hampshire starting goalie Jenn Gilligan made 27 saves but allowed eight goals in two periods. She was replaced by Moe Bradley in the third period. Bradley stopped 11 of 14 shots as the Wildcats suffered their worst loss in the 35 year history of the program.
November 26: Nicole Gifford scored the first hat trick of her career as the Wildcats defeated the Princeton Tigers by a 3-1 mark. The Wildcats improved to 38-5-2 lifetime against Princeton.
January 28: Kristina Lavoie scored her first career hat trick in a 4-2 victory over Vermont.

Standings

Schedule

Conference record

Awards and honors
Heather Kashman, Hockey East Rookie of the Week (Week of October 3, 2011)
Kristina Lavoie, Hockey East Player of the Week (Week of January 16. 2012)
Kristina Lavoie, New Hampshire, Co-Hockey East Player of the Week (Week of January 31, 2011)
New Hampshire Wildcats, Hockey East Team of the Week (Week of October 3, 2011)

References

New Hampshire
New Hampshire Wildcats women's ice hockey seasons
New Ham
New Ham